An All-American team is an honorary sports team composed of the best amateur players of a specific season for each team position—who in turn are given the honorific "All-America" and typically referred to as "All-American athletes", or simply "All-Americans". Although the honorees generally do not compete together as a unit, the term is used in U.S. team sports to refer to players who are selected by members of the national media.  Walter Camp selected the first All-America team in the early days of American football in 1889.  The 2023 NCAA Men's Basketball All-Americans are honorary lists that include All-American selections from the Associated Press (AP), the United States Basketball Writers Association (USBWA), Sporting News (SN), and the National Association of Basketball Coaches (NABC) for the 2022–23 NCAA Division I men's basketball season. All selectors choose three teams, while AP also lists honorable mention selections.

The Consensus 2023 College Basketball All-American team was determined by aggregating the results of the four major All-American teams as determined by the National Collegiate Athletic Association (NCAA). Since United Press International was replaced by SN in 1997, the four major selectors have been the aforementioned ones. AP has been a selector since 1948, NABC since 1957 and USBWA since 1960.  To earn "consensus" status, a player must win honors based on a point system computed from the four different all-America teams. The point system consists of three points for first team, two points for second team and one point for third team. No honorable mention or fourth team or lower are used in the computation. The top five totals plus ties are first team and the next five plus ties are second team.

2023 Consensus All-America team

PG – Point guard
SG – Shooting guard
PF – Power forward
SF – Small forward
C – Center

Individual All-America teams

By player

By team

AP Honorable Mention:

 Max Abmas, Oral Roberts
 Tyree Appleby, Wake Forest
 Souley Boum, Xavier
 Tyger Campbell, UCLA
 Marcus Carr, Texas
 Yuri Collins, Saint Louis
 Antoine Davis, Detroit Mercy
 Kendric Davis, Memphis
 Hunter Dickinson, Michigan
 Kyle Filipowski, Duke
 Adam Flagler, Baylor
 Ryan Kalkbrenner, Creighton
 Darius McGhee, Liberty
 Mike Miles Jr., TCU
 Adama Sanogo, UConn
 Wade Taylor IV, Texas A&M
 Isaiah Wong, Miami (FL)

Academic All-Americans
College Sports Communicators (known before the 2022–23 school year as the College Sports Information Directors of America) announced its 15-member 2023 Academic All-America team on March 14, 2023, divided into first, second and third teams, with Ben Vander Plas of Virginia repeating as men's college basketball Academic All-American of the Year.

References

All-Americans
NCAA Men's Basketball All-Americans